Antonio Capellan (Venice, ca. 1740– Rome, 1793)  was an Italian engraver, active in a Neoclassical style.

Biography
He trained with Joseph Wagner. Capellan is best known for making engraved copies of masterworks of the Italian Renaissance found in private collections, which were published in Gavin Hamilton's work, Schola Italica Picturae.

He also engraved a series of portraits of cardinals titled "Calcographia R.C.A. apud Pedem Marmoreum". In 1759, he engraved portraits of Michelangelo and Giorgio Vasari for a volume of the life of Vasari, curated by Bottari.

References

Italian engravers
Year of birth uncertain
1793 deaths